Christopher Ward may refer to:

 Christopher Ward (British politician) (born 1942), British solicitor and Conservative Party politician
 Christopher Ward (conductor) (born 1980), British conductor
 Christopher Ward (entomologist) (1836–1900), English entomologist
 Christopher Ward (journalist) (born 1942), former editor of the British newspaper Daily Express and Daily Mirror columnist
 Christopher Ward (songwriter) (born 1949), Canadian songwriter and broadcaster
 Christopher Ward (watchmaker), British company established 2004, watchmaker
 Christopher Brendan Ward, American rapper and voice actor, better known as MC Chris
 Christopher J. Ward, American politician, early 21st century treasurer of the National Republican Congressional Committee
 Christopher Joseph Ward (born 1965), known as C. J. Ramone, American musician, bassist for punk rock group The Ramones
 Christopher O. Ward (born 1955), Executive Director of the Port Authority of New York and New Jersey
 Chris Ward (chess player) (Christopher G. Ward, born 1968), British chess Grandmaster

See also
 Chris Ward (disambiguation)